Piacenza Calcio crashed out of Serie A, following a dismal season. With ex-Inter coach Luigi Simoni at the helm, the club was looking to climb into midtable in Serie A, but the absence of Simone Inzaghi and the ageing of several key players rendered disastrous form, and Simoni was soon sacked. In the end, Piacenza finished rock bottom of the table and their five-year stint in the top flight was ended.

Squad

Goalkeepers
  Michele Nicoletti
  Flavio Roma
  Matteo Giovagnoli
  Davide Bagnacani

Defenders
  Giordano Caini
  Daniele Delli Carri
  Gianluca Lamacchi
  Alessandro Lucarelli
  Andrea Maccagni
  Gian Paolo Manighetti
  Cleto Polonia
  Stefano Sacchetti
  Matteo Savioni
  Pietro Vierchowod

Midfielders
  Renato Buso
  Paolo Cristallini
  Carmine Gautieri
  Alessandro Mazzola
  Stefano Morrone
  Gianpietro Piovani
  Francesco Statuto
  Giovanni Stroppa
  Andrea Tagliaferri
  Francesco Zitolo

Attackers
  Arturo Di Napoli
  Davide Dionigi
  Luigi Forlini
  Alberto Gilardino
  Massimo Rastelli
  Ruggiero Rizzitelli
  Francesco Zerbini

Serie A

Matches

Top scorers
  Arturo Di Napoli 4 (3)
  Alberto Gilardino 3
  Davide Dionigi 3 (1)
  Gianpietro Piovani 2
  Massimo Rastelli 2

References

Sources
  RSSSF - Italy 1999/2000

Piacenza Calcio 1919 seasons
Piacenza